Paul Wiesner (9 October 1855 – 1 October 1930) was a German sailor who competed in the 1900 Summer Olympics.

He was the helmsman of the German boat Aschenbrödel, which won the gold medal in the second race of 1 – 2 ton class and silver medal in the open class. He also participated in the ½—1 ton class, but his boat Aschenbrödel weighed in at 1.041 tons instead of less than a 1 ton, and he was disqualified.

Further reading

References

External links

1855 births
1930 deaths
German male sailors (sport)
Sailors at the 1900 Summer Olympics – .5 to 1 ton
Sailors at the 1900 Summer Olympics – 1 to 2 ton
Sailors at the 1900 Summer Olympics – Open class
Olympic sailors of Germany
Medalists at the 1900 Summer Olympics
Olympic gold medalists for Germany
Olympic silver medalists for Germany
Olympic medalists in sailing
People from Nowa Sól